The 2020–21 Indian Super League season was the seventh season of the Indian Super League (ISL) since its formation and the 25th season of the top division of the Indian football league system. The season started on 20 November 2020 and ended on 13 March 2021. It was hosted behind closed doors across three venues in Goa due to the COVID-19 pandemic in India.

Mumbai City won the championship, having defeated ATK Mohun Bagan in the final, and also won the League Winners Shield for league premiers. Thus, Mumbai City became the first club to win the ISL championship title and the League Winners Shield in a single season.

Changes from last season
Each club has the option of signing a minimum of five and a maximum of seven foreign players. Still, unlike the previous season, there should be at least one overseas player who hails from an AFC–affiliated country.
The maximum squad size is increased as the clubs are allowed to register up to 35 players in their squad.
The number of substitutions allowed has been increased from 3 players to 5 players.
Due to the COVID-19 pandemic, all matches during the 2020–21 season will be played behind closed doors across three venues in Goa. The venues will be the Fatorda Stadium in Margao, the GMC Athletic Stadium in Bambolim, and the Tilak Maidan Stadium in Vasco da Gama. The host venues for each team were revealed on 18 August 2020.
On 27 September 2020, East Bengal joined the league as an expansion team and thus became the 11th team.
Due to all the matches of the League being played in neutral venues, there will be no away goal rule to be applied in the playoffs this season.

Teams

Stadiums and locations

Personnel and sponsorship

Head coaching changes

Roster changes

Foreign players

Bold letters suggest the player was signed in the winter transfer window.

Regular season

League table

Results

Playoffs

Bracket

Semi-finals

Final

Season statistics

Scoring

Top scorers

Top Indian scorers

Hat-tricks

Result column shows goal tally of player's team first.

Notes
(H) – Home team(A) – Away team

Assists

Clean sheets

Discipline

Player 
 Most yellow cards: 8
  Pronay Halder (ATK Mohun Bagan)
  Erik Paartalu (Bengaluru)

 Most red cards: 2
  Ahmed Jahouh (Mumbai City)

Club 

 Most yellow cards: 61 
 Mumbai City

 Most red cards: 4 
 East Bengal
 Jamshedpur
 Goa

Awards

Hero of the Match

Season awards

See also
 2020−21 I-League
 2020–21 in Indian football

Notes

References

External links
 

 
Indian Super League
Indian Super League seasons
Association football events curtailed due to the COVID-19 pandemic
Sport in Goa